Boharm is an unincorporated community in Saskatchewan along the course of Thunder Creek.

See also 
 List of communities in Saskatchewan

References 

Moose Jaw No. 161, Saskatchewan
Unincorporated communities in Saskatchewan